Kitti Sor.Jor.Danrayong (born August 3, 1999) is a Thai Muay Thai fighter from the Chanthaburi Province in Eastern Thailand. Kitti is known for his emphasis of elbows as part of his fighting style.

He currently competes for Thai Fight, where he has won two titles with the promotion.

Titles and accomplishments
Thai Fight
 2019 THAI FIGHT 70 kg Kard Chuek King's Cup Champion 
 2021 THAI FIGHT 70 kg Kard Chuek King's Cup Champion 

MAX Muay Thai 
 2017 MAX Muay Thai 69 kg Tournament Champion

Fight record

|-  style="background:#cfc;"
| 2023-02-26|| Win ||align=left| Elad Suman  || Thai Fight KonlakPathum || Pathum Thani province, Thailand || Decision || 3 ||3:00 

|- style="background:#CCFFCC;"
| 2022-12-24|| Win || align="left" |  Jaipetch Sitjaopho|| Thai Fight: Metropolitan Police Bureau 100th Anniversary || Bangkok, Thailand || Decision || 3 || 3:00 
|- style="background:#CCFFCC;"
| 2022-11-20|| Win || align="left" | Logan Andoche|| THAI FIGHT Vana Nava Hua Hin || Hua Hin district, Thailand || KO (Elbows)|| 2 ||  
|- style="background:#cfc;"
| 2022-10-16|| Win|| align="left" | Emerson Bento || THAI FIGHT Vajiravudh || Bangkok, Thailand || Decision ||3  ||3:00  
|- style="background:#cfc;"
| 2022-05-29|| Win || align="left" | Mikaeil Amiri || THAI FIGHT Nakhon Sawan || Nakhon Sawan province, Thailand || KO (Elbow) ||2  || 
|- style="background:#CCFFCC;"
| 2022-05-08|| Win || align="left" | Lautaro Pereyra || THAI FIGHT Sung Noen || Sung Noen district, Thailand || KO || 1 || 
|- style="background:#CCFFCC;"
| 2022-03-20|| Win || align="left" | Thiago Teixeira || THAI FIGHT Lampang || Lampang, Thailand || Decision || 3 || 3:00

|-  style="background:#CCFFCC;"
| 2021-12-19 || Win ||align=left| Thiago Teixeira || THAI FIGHT Khao Aor || Phatthalung, Thailand || Decision || 3 || 3:00 
|-
! style=background:white colspan=9 |
|-  style="background:#CCFFCC;"
| 2021-07-04 || Win ||align=left| Vladimir Shuliak || THAI FIGHT Strong || Pattaya, Thailand || TKO (Referee stoppage) || 2 ||
|-  style="background:#CCFFCC;"
| 2021-04-25 || Win ||align=left| Reza Ahmadnezhad || THAI FIGHT DMHTT || Samut Sakhon, Thailand || KO (Left knee to the body) || 2 ||
|-  style="background:#CCFFCC;"
| 2021-04-03 || Win ||align=left| Erik Massion || THAI FIGHT Nan || Nan, Thailand || KO (Elbow & punches) || 1 ||
|-  style="background:#CCFFCC;"
| 2020-11-07 || Win ||align=left| Victor Hugo || THAI FIGHT Korat 2020 || Nakhon Ratchasima, Thailand || TKO (3 Knockdowns) || 1 ||
|-  style="background:#CCFFCC;"
| 2020-10-17 || Win ||align=left| Nata Gomes || THAI FIGHT Begins || Nonthaburi, Thailand || TKO (3 Knockdowns) || 1 ||
|-  style="background:#CCFFCC;"
| 2020-09-19 || Win ||align=left| Ruslan Ataev || THAI FIGHT New Normal || Bangkok, Thailand || KO (Elbow) || 1 ||
|-  style="background:#CCFFCC;"
| 2019-12-21 || Win ||align=left| Gabriel Mazzetti || THAI FIGHT Patong || Phuket, Thailand || Decision || 3 ||3:00 
|-
! style=background:white colspan=9 |
|-  style="background:#CCFFCC;"
| 2019-11-23|| Win ||align=left| Hamed Soleimani || THAI FIGHT Mae Sot || Tak, Thailand || KO (Body Kick) || 1 ||
|-  style="background:#CCFFCC;"
| 2019-10-26 || Win ||align=left| Mehdi Jaouadi || THAI FIGHT Bangsaen || Chonburi, Thailand || KO (Elbow) || 1 ||
|-  style="background:#CCFFCC;"
| 2019-08-24 || Win ||align=left| Sergio Mazzetti || THAI FIGHT Kham Chanod || Udon Thani, Thailand || TKO (Doctor Stoppage) || 2 ||
|-  style="background:#CCFFCC;"
| 2019-06-29 || Win ||align=left| Leonardo Giosi || THAI FIGHT Betong || Betong, Thailand || KO (Elbow) || 2 ||
|-  style="background:#CCFFCC;"
| 2019-04-27 || Win ||align=left| Nikita Gerasimovich || THAI FIGHT Samui 2019 || Ko Samui, Thailand || TKO || 2 ||
|-  style="background:#CCFFCC;"
| 2019-03-30 || Win ||align=left| Andi Uustalu || THAI FIGHT Mueang Khon 2019 || Nakhon Si Thammarat, Thailand || TKO (Knees & Elbows) || 2 ||
|-  style="background:#CCFFCC;"
| 2019-02-23 || Win ||align=left| Alex Sousa || THAI FIGHT Phuket 2019 || Phuket, Thailand || KO (Elbow) || 1 ||
|-  style="background:#CCFFCC;"
| 2018-12-22 || Win||align=left| Pasquale Amoroso || THAI FIGHT Nakhon Ratchasima 2018 ||  Nakhon Ratchasima, Thailand || TKO (Punches) || 1 ||
|-  style="background:#CCFFCC;"
| 2018-11-24 || Win ||align=left| Anton Tolkmit || THAI FIGHT Saraburi || Saraburi, Thailand || TKO (Punches) || 1 ||
|-  style="background:#CCFFCC;"
| 2018-10-21 || Win ||align=left| Hassan Vahdanirad || Muay Thai Super Champ || Bangkok, Thailand || KO || 2 || 2:55
|-  style="background:#CCFFCC;"
| 2018-09-23 || Win ||align=left| Thomas Hayden || Muay Thai Super Champ || Bangkok, Thailand || TKO || 2  || 2:00
|-  style="background:#CCFFCC;"
| 2018-08-26 || Win ||align=left| Nima Vakilitamougheh || Muay Thai Super Champ ||  Bangkok, Thailand || KO || 1 || 2:01
|-  style="background:#CCFFCC;"
| 2018-07-29 || Win||align=left| Sven Van Hof || Muay Thai Super Champ ||  Bangkok, Thailand || TKO || 2 || 0:00
|-  style="background:#CCFFCC;"
| 2018-05-06 || Win||align=left| Thoeun Theara || MAX Muay Thai||  Pattaya, Thailand || KO (Knees) || 2 || 2:58
|-  style="background:#CCFFCC;"
| 2018-01-05 || Win||align=left| Chokchai Pran26 ||MAX Muay Thai||  Thailand ||  Decision  || 3 || 3:00
|-  style="background:#CCFFCC;"
| 2017-11-26 || Win ||align=left| Luke Bar || MAX Muay Thai||  Pattaya, Thailand || Decision  || 3 || 3:00
|-  style="background:#CCFFCC;"
| 2017-07-22 || Win ||align=left| Daomangkorn Kaisansukgym || MAX Muay Thai||  Pattaya, Thailand || TKO || 2 || 
|-
! style=background:white colspan=9 |
|-  style="background:#CCFFCC;"
| 2017-07-22 || Win ||align=left| Petmeechai Petcharoen || MAX Muay Thai||  Pattaya, Thailand || TKO (Elbow) || 1 ||
|-  style="background:#CCFFCC;"
| 2017-06-06 || Win ||align=left| Valentin Thibaut || MAX Muay Thai||  Pattaya, Thailand || Decision || 3 || 3:00
|-  style="background:#fbb;"
| 2016-07-31 || Loss||align=left| Phetnarin Gluerare 1T || Rangsit Stadium ||  Rangsit, Thailand || Decision || 5 || 3:00
|-  style="background:#cfc;"
| 2016-06-26 || Win||align=left| Phetnarin Gluerare 1T || Rajadamnern Stadium ||  Bangkok, Thailand || Decision || 5 || 3:00
|-  style="background:#cfc;"
| 2016-01-02 || Win||align=left| Petchsingha Nitipattanaikwam || Omnoi Stadium ||  Thailand || Decision || 5 || 3:00
|-  style="background:#cfc;"
| 2015-11-04 || Win||align=left| Nongbenz Singtaladthai|| Rajadamnern Stadium ||  Bangkok, Thailand || Decision || 5 || 3:00
|-  style="background:#cfc;"
| 2015-10-08 || Win||align=left| Lukyod Sitthidanan || Rajadamnern Stadium ||  Bangkok, Thailand || Decision || 5 || 3:00
|-  style="background:#fbb;"
| 2015-09-16 || Loss ||align=left| Sakmongkol Sor.Sommai || Rajadamnern Stadium ||  Bangkok, Thailand || Decision || 5 || 3:00
|-
| colspan=9 | Legend:

References 

Kitti Sor.Jor.Danrayong
Kitti Sor.Jor.Danrayong
Welterweight kickboxers
Living people
1999 births
Kitti Sor.Jor.Danrayong